Borboryctis triplaca is a moth of the family Gracillariidae. It is native to Japan (Honshū) and India (Meghalaya).

References

Acrocercopinae
Moths described in 1908
Moths of Asia
Moths of Japan